The 2019-20 RIT Tigers men's ice hockey season was the 56th season of play for the program, the 15th at the Division I level, and the 14th season in the Atlantic Hockey conference. The Tigers represented the Rochester Institute of Technology and were coached by Wayne Wilson, in his 21st season.

On March 12, 2020, Atlantic Hockey announced that the remainder of the conference tournament was cancelled due to the coronavirus pandemic.

Roster

As of December 14, 2019

Standings

Schedule and Results

|-
!colspan=12 style=";" | Regular Season

|-
!colspan=12 style=";" | 

|-
!colspan=12 style=";" | 
|- align="center" bgcolor="#e0e0e0"
|colspan=12|Tournament Cancelled

Scoring Statistics

Goaltending statistics

Rankings

References

RIT Tigers men's ice hockey seasons
RIT Tigers
RIT Tigers
2019 in sports in New York (state)
2020 in sports in New York (state)